The following is a list of the 19 cantons of the Vienne department, in France, following the French canton reorganisation which came into effect in March 2015:

 Chasseneuil-du-Poitou
 Châtellerault-1
 Châtellerault-2
 Châtellerault-3
 Chauvigny
 Civray
 Jaunay-Marigny
 Loudun
 Lusignan
 Lussac-les-Châteaux
 Migné-Auxances
 Montmorillon
 Poitiers-1
 Poitiers-2
 Poitiers-3
 Poitiers-4
 Poitiers-5
 Vivonne
 Vouneuil-sous-Biard

References